The Cathedral of Saint John the Baptist is an Episcopal cathedral in San Juan, Puerto Rico. It is the seat of the Diocese of Puerto Rico and it is located in the Santurce district of San Juan.

History

The first service of the Mission of St. John the Baptist was held on March 12, 1899, in a hall on the plaza in Old San Juan.  The Rev. James Van Buren came to Puerto Rico in February 1901 and on Christmas Eve of that year St. John's became a parish with Van Buren as the first rector.  The cornerstone for the congregation's first church was laid on December 26, 1902.  Old San Juan increasingly became a commercial center and its residents moved elsewhere.  In 1928 Bishop Charles Colmore proposed relocating St. John's and St. Luke's Church in new locations.  The following year the bishop spoke of St. John's and St. Catherine's Training School for Women relocating at Santurce with the hope that St. John's Day School and the rectory would join them.  The groundbreaking for the present church took place on February 22, 1929, and it was completed the following February.

See also
List of the Episcopal cathedrals of the United States
List of cathedrals in the United States

References

External links
Parish website

Cathedrals in Puerto Rico
Juan Bautista, San Juan
Anglican cathedrals in the Caribbean
Santurce, San Juan, Puerto Rico
Buildings and structures in San Juan, Puerto Rico
Episcopal churches in Puerto Rico
1899 establishments in Puerto Rico
Churches completed in 1930